Buck Pond is a small reservoir on Eglin Air Force Base, southeast of Milton, Florida and north of Navarre, Florida.

The pond is reportedly fishable and accessible for members of the general public with prior permits and permission from Eglin Air Force Base.

References 

Bodies of water of Santa Rosa County, Florida
Navarre, Florida